Czermin may refer to the following places:

Czermin, Kępno County in Greater Poland Voivodeship (west-central Poland)
Czermin, Podkarpackie Voivodeship (south-east Poland)
Czermin, Subcarpathian Voivodeship (south-east Poland)
Czermin, Świętokrzyskie Voivodeship (south-central Poland)
Czermin, Pleszew County in Greater Poland Voivodeship (west-central Poland)